José María Obaldía (Treinta y Tres, 16 August 1925) is a Uruguayan teacher, writer, and lexicographer.

His poems have been sung by several important Uruguayan singers, such as Los Olimareños, Teresita Minetti, Los del Yerbal, Wilson Prieto, Ricardo Comba, etc.

He presided over the National Academy of Uruguay (1999-2003).

He is the father of communicator María Inés Obaldía.

Works 
 Veinte mentiras de verdad. Cuentos. Edit. Unión del Magisterio (1971), Ediciones de la Banda Oriental (1973, 1993, 1994, 1995, 2003, 2004), Cámara del Libro (1985). Premio Ministerio de Educación y Cultura (1994).
 Versos y canciones en la escuela. En colaboración con Luis Neira. Ediciones de la Banda Oriental, 1973. Premio Ministerio de Instrucción Pública.
 El gaucho. Complementación pedagógica de textos de Roberto Ares Pons. Ediciones de la Banda Oriental, 1973.
 Eduardo Fabini. Soneto. Primer Premio del concurso de la Asociación de Jubilados y Pensionistas Escolares, Centenario de Solís de Mataojo, 1974.
 Antología de la narrativa infantil uruguaya. En colaboración con Luis Neira. Ediciones de la Banda Oriental, 1978.
 Lejos... allá y ayer. Editorial Amauta, 1973. Primer premio concurso Editorial Acali y diario El Día, 1980.
 El habla del pago. Voces y paremias de la región de Treinta y Tres. Ediciones de la Banda Oriental (1988, 2001, 2006)
 Sol de recreo. Poemas. Editorial AULA, 1989.
 Historia de la literatura infantil juvenil uruguaya. En coautoría con Luis Neira. Goethe University Frankfurt, 1978.
 La bandera de jabalí. Novela histórica. Editorial Monteverde, 1993.
 El fantasma del bucanero. Novela histórica. Editorial Reconquista, 1995.
 Bautista el equilibrista. Cuatro cuentos y doce canciones. Ediciones de la Banda Oriental, 1997.
 Tres cuentos del tío. Ediciones de la Banda Oriental, 1997. Premio Ministerio de Educación.
 Como pata de olla. Cuentos. Ediciones de la Banda Oriental, 1997. Dibujos de Carlos Pieri.
 El matrero y otros cuentos en prosa. Cuentos. Ediciones de la Banda Oriental, 2001.
 Telmo Batalla y otras prosas viejas. Cuentos. Ediciones de la Banda Oriental, 2004.
 Cuentos del pago. Cuentos. Editorial Planeta, 2013.

References

1925 births
Living people
People from Treinta y Tres
Uruguayan educators
Uruguayan lexicographers
Uruguayan writers
Members of the Uruguayan Academy of Language
Recipients of the Delmira Agustini Medal